Kurt Dürnhöfer (1886–1958) was a German art director.

Selected filmography
 Ruth's Two Husbands (1919)
 The Living Dead (1919)
 A Dying Nation (1922)
 The Emperor's Old Clothes (1923)
 Taras Bulba (1924)
 Almenrausch and Edelweiss (1928)
 Greetings and Kisses, Veronika (1933)
 The Two Seals (1934)
 Elisabeth and the Fool (1934)
 At the Strasbourg (1934)
 His Late Excellency (1935)
 Last Stop (1935)
 A Strange Guest (1936)
 Silence in the Forest (1937)
 Storms in May (1938)
 A Heart Beats for You (1949)

References

Bibliography 
 Bogusław Drewniak. Der Deutsche Film 1938-1945: ein Gesamtüberblick. Droste, 1987.

External links 
 

1886 births
1958 deaths
German art directors
Film people from Berlin